Wolfson is a surname.

Wolfson may also refer to:

 Wolfson College, University of Cambridge
 Wolfson College, University of Oxford
 The Wolfson Foundation, founded by Isaac Wolfson
 Wolfson Microelectronics, an electronics company
 Samuel W. Wolfson High School, a public high school in Jacksonville, FL
 Wolfson Building, a building of Somerville College, Oxford